Þorsteinn Hjálmarsson (20 September 1911 – 10 December 1984) was an Icelandic water polo player. He competed in the men's tournament at the 1936 Summer Olympics.

References

External links

1911 births
1984 deaths
Icelandic male water polo players
Olympic water polo players of Iceland
Water polo players at the 1936 Summer Olympics
Place of birth missing